Xavier Eduardo Zablah Bukele is a Salvadoran politician who is the current president of the Nuevas Ideas political party. He is a cousin of Nayib Bukele, the incumbent president of El Salvador since 2019.

References

External links 

 Biography of Xavier Zablah Bukele (in Spanish)

Year of birth unknown
Living people
Salvadoran politicians
People from San Salvador
People from San Salvador Department
Salvadoran people of Palestinian descent
Bukele family
Year of birth missing (living people)
Nuevas Ideas politicians